The Kuaotunu River is a short river on the eastern Coromandel Peninsula on the North Island of New Zealand. It flows north towards the coast at Kuaotunu.

See also
List of rivers of New Zealand

References

Thames-Coromandel District
Rivers of Waikato
Rivers of New Zealand